Thomas J. Herlihy, Jr. (November 29, 1956 – May 8, 2015) was an American politician and businessman. Herlihy, a Republican, was a resident of Simsbury, Connecticut. He was sworn in as a member of Simsbury's Board of Selectmen on December 7, 2009. Herlihy was the State Senator for the 8th Senatorial District from 1999 to 2009, representing the northwest suburbs of Hartford in the Farmington Valley and Litchfield County in the Connecticut Senate, including the towns of Avon, Barkhamsted, Canton, Colebrook, Granby, Hartland, Harwinton, New Hartford, Norfolk, Simsbury, and Torrington.

Biography
Herlihy was born in Queens, New York and received a B.S. in Education from the University of Hartford. He taught in the Simsbury School District and then worked in the insurance business. In 1983, he started his insurance business in Simsbury: the T. J. Herlihy Insurance. From 1987 to 1990, Herlihy was on Simsbury's Board of Selectmen. In 1991, he was elected to the Board of Finance and served as chairman in 1996. In 1997, he became the State Representative for the 16th Assembly District, a position he held until his election to the Senate. While at the General Assembly, Senator Herlihy was honored by the Connecticut State Firefighters Association for spearheading efforts to provide thermal imaging equipment for fire departments throughout Connecticut. After retiring from the Senate after five terms, Herlihy was once again re-elected to the Board of Selectmen on November 3, 2009. Herlihy died on May 8, 2015.

References

External links
http://www.4simsburysfuture.com/fullslate.html#TomHerlihy
http://www.4simsburysfuture.com/tomherlihy.html

1956 births
2015 deaths
People from Simsbury, Connecticut
People from Queens, New York
University of Hartford alumni
Businesspeople from Connecticut
Educators from Connecticut
Republican Party members of the Connecticut House of Representatives
Republican Party Connecticut state senators
Educators from New York City
20th-century American businesspeople